Sedgwick USD 439 is a public unified school district headquartered in Sedgwick, Kansas, United States.  The district includes the communities of Sedgwick, Putnam, and nearby rural areas.

Schools
The school district operates the following schools:
 Sedgwick Junior/Senior High School
 R.L. Wright Elementary

See also
 List of high schools in Kansas
 List of unified school districts in Kansas
 Kansas State Department of Education
 Kansas State High School Activities Association

References

External links
 

School districts in Kansas
Education in Harvey County, Kansas